The 1975 Nice International Championships, was a men's tennis tournament played on outdoor clay courts at the Nice Lawn Tennis Club in Nice, France that was part of the ATP European Winter Circuit. It was the fourth edition of the tournament and was held from 5 May until 11 May 1975. Second-seeded Dick Crealy won the title.

Finals

Singles
 Dick Crealy defeated  Iván Molina 7–6, 6–4, 6–3
 It was Crealy's first singles title of the year and the second of his career.

Doubles
 Marcello Lara /  Joaquín Loyo-Mayo defeated  Iván Molina /  Jairo Velasco Sr. 7–6, 6–7, 8–6

References

External links
 ITF tournament edition details

Nice International Championships
1975
Nice International Championships
Nice International Championships
20th century in Nice